Calero may refer to:

People 
 Adolfo Calero (1931–2012), Nicaraguan businessman, and leader of the Nicaraguan Democratic Force
 Agustín Ramos Calero (1919–1989), Puerto Rican soldier in World War II
Carlos Calero (born 1972), Colombian television presenter
Dennis Calero (born 1972), U.S. American illustrator and comic book artist
Diego Calero (born 1940), Colombian cyclist
Fernando Calero (born 1995), Spanish football player
Franco Calero (born 1989), Argentinian football player
Gloria Calero Sierra (1906–1990), Mexican artist
 Inés María Calero (born 1969), Miss Venezuela titleholder for 1987
Iván Calero (born 1995), Spanish football player
Juan José Calero (born 1998), Colombian/Mexican football player
Juan Sebastián Calero (born 1982), Colombian actor
Julián Calero (born 1970), Spanish footballer and coach
Kiko Calero (born 1975), Puerto Rican Major League Baseball relief pitcher
Marcelo Calero (born 1982), Brazilian politician
Marcos Calero Pérez (born 1993), Spanish football player
 Marisol Calero (born 1963), Puerto Rican actress and singer
 Miguel Calero (1971–2012), Colombian football goalkeeper
Nacho Calero (born 1991), Spanish motorcycle racer
Patricio Calero (born 1977), Ecuadorian boxer
 Ricardo Carballo Calero (1910–1990), Spanish philologist, academic and writer
Róger Calero (born 1969), Nicaraguan American journalist
 Rudel Calero (born 1982), Nicaraguan football player

Other 
 Isla Calero (English: Calero Island), Costa Rican island
Calero Reservoir, artificial lake in the Santa Teresa Hills, California, formed in 1935
Lake Calero, artificial lake in Sacramento County, California, formed in 1982

See also 
 Jorge "el Calero" Suárez (1945–1997), former Salvadoran footballer
 Estadio Jorge Calero Suárez, multi-purpose stadium in Metapán, El Salvador